Phycodes taonopa is a moth in the family Brachodidae. It was described by Edward Meyrick in 1909. It is found in Vietnam and Assam, India.

References

Brachodidae
Moths described in 1909